Doreen's Jazz New Orleans  is a Dixieland and Traditional Jazz band created and led by clarinetist Doreen Ketchens. The group has toured the world, and performs in the Royal Street Performing Arts zone in the French Quarter of New Orleans, at jazz festivals, fairs, showcases, and concert halls. Videos of the group by fans, news, and entertainment organizations have been seen by millions of people on the Internet and the group has recorded more than 20 CDs or DVDs of the group's work.  The group has been featured in numerous articles, including New Orleans' Jazz radio station's Busker Blog.

Ketchens began playing in Jackson Square with her first band, the Jackson Square All-Stars. Their band evolved into "Doreen's Jazz New Orleans," and, after much struggle with the chauvinism of traditional Jazz and club owners, they managed to find a winning formula playing and entertaining crowds via their street shows, Jazz festivals, and then, through direct sales of their music and videos on the Internet.

References

Musical groups with year of establishment missing
Musical groups from New Orleans
Dixieland revival ensembles
American jazz ensembles from New Orleans
African-American jazz musicians